This article lists broadcasters, commentators, and field reporters who have presented games of the Boston-based American professional soccer club New England Revolution. As a founding member of the Major League Soccer league, Revolution matches have been broadcast on television and radio since the team's first season in 1996.

Television

2020s

2010s

2000s

1990s

Radio

2020s

2010s

2000s

1990s

Notes
Spencer Ross filled in for Butch Stearns five times in 1999 due to Stearns' television commitments.

See also
 List of current Major League Soccer commentators
 List of Boston Red Sox broadcasters
 List of Boston Celtics broadcasters
 List of Boston Bruins broadcasters
 List of New England Patriots broadcasters

Major League Soccer on television
Lists of Major League Soccer broadcasters
New England Revolution broadcasters